The terminal nerve, also known as cranial nerve 0 or simply as CN 0, is a nerve that was not included in the seminal classification of the cranial nerves as CN I through CN XII but is now generally classified as a cranial nerve. It was discovered by German scientist Gustav Fritsch in 1878 in the brains of sharks. It was first found in humans in 1913.
A 1990 study has indicated that the terminal nerve is a common finding in the adult human brain.
The nerve has been called unofficially by other names, including cranial nerve XIII, zero nerve, nerve N, 
and NT.

Structure

The terminal nerve appears just anterior of the other cranial nerves bilaterally as a microscopic plexus of unmyelinated peripheral nerve fascicles in the subarachnoid space covering the gyrus rectus. This plexus appears near the cribriform plate and travels posteriorly toward the olfactory trigone, medial olfactory gyrus, and lamina terminalis.

The nerve is often overlooked in autopsies because it is unusually thin for a cranial nerve, and is often torn out upon exposing the brain. Careful dissection is necessary to visualize the nerve. Its purpose and mechanism of function is still open to debate; consequently, nerve zero is often not mentioned in anatomy textbooks.

Development
The zebrafish was used as a developmental model in research from 2004.

The connections between the terminal nerve and the olfactory system have been extensively studied in human embryos. It was found to enter the brain at stages 17 and 18 from olfactory origins.

Function
Although very close to (and often confused for a branch of) the olfactory nerve, the terminal nerve is not connected to the olfactory bulb, where smells are analyzed. This fact suggests that the nerve is either vestigial or may be related to the sensing of pheromones. This hypothesis is further supported by the fact that the terminal nerve projects to the medial and lateral septal nuclei and the preoptic areas, all of which are involved in regulating sexual behavior in mammals, as well as a 1987 study finding that mating in hamsters is reduced when the terminal nerve is severed.

Additional images

See also
Vomeronasal organ

References

External links

Cranial nerves